Virudhagiri is a 2010 Indian Tamil-language action film written and directed by Vijayakanth, making his directorial debut, besides playing the title character as well. This was also his final film in his cinematic career before his full-fledged career into politics. It was later dubbed in Hindi as Inspector Dabangg. It is a remake of the English language French film Taken.

Although this movie is supposed to occur in Australia, it was actually shot in Malaysia.

Plot
Virudhagiri (Vijayakanth), a sincere police officer endeavors in safeguarding the societal peace. Gaining international recognition for accomplishing a security task in foreign countries, he returns to Chennai handling a serious case of transgenders being scourged to death for organ racketing. On an unexpected turn, his niece Priya (Madhuri Itagi) undertakes a trip to Australia, where she gets kidnapped by a group of strangers. Using his high-skilled intelligence activities, Virudhagiri flies down to the foreign land for the rescue.

Cast

 Vijayakanth as Virudhagiri IPS
 Arun Pandian as Franklin, Australian police officer 
 Madhuri Itagi as Priya
 K. C. Shankar as Mike Anderson
 Mansoor Ali Khan as Police inspector
 Shanmugarajan
 Santhana Bharathi as Police commissioner
 Chaams as Saamy
 Russell Geoffrey Banks as Chief police
 Peeli Sivam as Virudhagiri's father
 Kalairani as Virudhagiri's mother
 Uma as Priya's mother
 Aman Deep Singh

Soundtrack 
The soundtrack was composed by Sundar C. Babu.

References

External links
 

2010 films
2010s Tamil-language films
Films scored by Sundar C. Babu
Indian remakes of French films
2010 directorial debut films